Zidi may refer to:
 Claude Zidi (born 1934), French film director and screenwriter
 Malik Zidi (born 1975), French film, television and theater actor
 Zidi (film), a 1998 film with Pakistani actress Reema Khan
 a common fig cultivar